Cap Canaille is a 1983 French drama film directed by Juliet Berto and Jean-Henri Roger. It was entered into the 33rd Berlin International Film Festival.

Cast
 Juliet Berto as Paula Baretto
 Richard Bohringer as Robert Vergès
 Jean-Claude Brialy as Me Samuel Kebadjan
 Bernadette Lafont as Mireille Kebadjan
 Patrick Chesnais as Wim
 Gérard Darmon as Nino Baretto
 Richard Anconina as Mayolles
 Nini Crépon as Dugrand
 Raúl Gimenez as Ernest la gâchette
 Andrex as Pascal Andreucci
 Jean Maurel as Ange Andreucci
 Toni Cecchinato as Hugo Zipo
 Richard Martin as Jo l'architecte
 Isabelle Ho as Miss Li

References

External links

1983 films
French drama films
1980s French-language films
1983 drama films
Films directed by Juliet Berto
Films directed by Jean-Henri Roger
1980s French films